"When You Look at Me" is a song by American singer Christina Milian. It was written by Milian, Christin Karlsson, Nina Woodford, Fredrik Odesio and Henrik Jonback, and produced by Bloodshy & Avant for her self-titled debut album (2001). The song served as the album's second single outside the United States and became a hit throughout Australia and Europe, reaching the top 10 in Australia, Flanders, Ireland, the Netherlands, and the United Kingdom.

Writing
Milian used her school days as inspiration when writing the song. Milian said that "when I was growing up, I found people were always trying to label me. The first day of school it would be like 'Here comes this girl all dressed up. She thinks she's all that' and they didn't even know me. The message behind 'When You Look at Me' is never judge a book by its cover."

Music video
The video was shot on March 2, 2002, in Los Angeles and was directed by Billie Woodruff. In the video, Milian dances in four different costumes and in different rooms. One costume is a white, short sleeved blouse with a pink mini-skirt and is featured in an area with pink and white walls. She is then seen in a blue room, with some jean material on the wall as wallpaper, dancing in with some background dancers. She is wearing blue jeans and a blue shirt. Next, she is shown in an orange room, wearing an orange camisole and orange pants, with a lot of male background dancers in white behind her. After this, she is seen in a small red room, sitting on a couch, wearing a red and black pashmina with her hair long and straight. The music video ends with a reprisal of the chorus, and switching between all four rooms.

Track listings

Notes
 denotes co-producer
 denotes additional producer

Charts

Weekly charts

Year-end charts

Certifications

Release history

References

External links
 

2002 singles
Christina Milian songs
Songs written by Christina Milian
Music videos directed by Bille Woodruff
Song recordings produced by Bloodshy & Avant
Songs written by Henrik Jonback
Songs written by Nina Woodford